The Gruppi Sportivi Fiamme Gialle is the sport section of the Italian police force, Guardia di Finanza.

The club's activity is carried out in the following twelve sports disciplines: athletics, swimming, judo, karate, shooting, fencing, diving, canoeing, rowing, sailing, alpine skiing, and speed skating. In the sport of athletics the group is called Gruppo Atletico Fiamme Gialle (G.A. Fiamme Gialle).

History

The first appearance of the Guardia di Finanza in the context of sports competitions dates back to 1911, with the participation of a team in the gymnastics competitions organized in Turin for the 50th anniversary of the Unification of Italy. However, the Scudo Nelli Trophy's first organized team, the Fiamme Gialle (Yellow Flames), was founded in 1921 to compete in a walking race. The trophy was eventually given out following three victories in 1922, 1925, and 1928.

In the following years the activity was expanded with the establishment of several sports groups, the first of which was the Skiers Group, founded in 1925 at the Alpine School of the Guardia di Finanza in Predazzo (in the province of Trento), a group that became famous as the Yellow Flames of Predazzo.

Greatest athletes

Summer Olympic Games medal table

In total, the athletes of the Fiamme Gialle won 42 medals at the Summer Olympics.

Winter Olympic Games medal table

In total, the athletes of the Fiamme Gialle won 22 (7 gold, 6 silver and 9 bronze), at the Winter Olympics.

2022 Bejing || Dorothea Wierer
|Biathlon - Sprint||
|}

Medal table by sport

Canoeing
Canoesist of Fiamme Gialle have won a total of eight medals at the Olympic Games.

See also
Guardia di Finanza
Italian military sports bodies
European Champion Clubs Cup (athletics)

References

External links
    

 
Athletics clubs in Italy
Sports organizations established in 1881
1881 establishments in Italy